The Archdiocese of Halyč was a late-medieval Latin Church ecclesiastical jurisdiction or archdiocese of the Catholic Church in Galicia (and originally Volhynia; both in present Ukraine) from 1367 until 1414.

History 
 Established 1367 as Diocese of Halyč / Galicia (English) / Halicien(sis) (Latin), on the political territory of Galicia and surroundings in modern Ukraine.
 Lost territory in 1375 in Volhynia to establish the Diocese of Lodomeria
 Promoted on 1375.02.13 as Metropolitan Archdiocese of Halyč / Galicia (English) / Halicien(sis) (Latin adjective)
 Suppressed on 1414.12.24, its territory being merged into the Metropolitan Roman Catholic Archdiocese of Lviv (Lemberg, Lvov), which its last incumbent was indeed transferred to.

Ordinaries 

Suffragan Bishops of Halyč
 Tomasz ze Lwowa (1358 – death 1363)
 Krystyn z Ostrowa, Conventual Franciscans (O.F.M. ?Conv.) (1364 – death 1371)
 Antoni (1371 – 1375)

Metropolitan Archbishops of Halyč
 z Egeru (1376.01 – death 1380)
 Bernard, O.F.M. ?Conv. (1385 – death 1391)
 Blessed Jakub Strzemię, O.F.M. ?Conv. (1392.10.28 – death 1409.10.20)
 Mikołaj Trąba (1410.06.18 – 1412.04.30), next Metropolitan Archbishop of Gniezno (Gnesen, Poland) (1412.04.30 – death 1422.12.02)
 Jan Rzeszowski (1412.08.26 – death 1414.12.23), next Metropolitan Archbishop of Lviv (Lemberg, Lwow, Ukraine) (1414.12.23 – 1436.08.12).

See also 
 List of Catholic dioceses in Ukraine

Sources and external links 
 GCatholic - data for all sections

Former Roman Catholic dioceses in Ex-Soviet Europe